The 1991–92 North West Counties Football League season was the tenth in the history of the North West Counties Football League, a football competition in England. Teams were divided into two divisions: Division One and Division Two.

Division One 

Division One featured three new teams, promoted from Division Two:
 Blackpool Rovers
 Bradford Park Avenue
 Great Harwood Town

League table

Division Two 

Division Two featured three new teams:

 Holker Old Boys, joined from the West Lancashire Football League
 Salford City, relegated from Division One
 Squires Gate, joined from the West Lancashire League

League table

References

External links 
 NWCFL Official Site

North West Counties Football League seasons
8